Gonçalo Garcias das Neves Maria (born 18 January 1996) is a Portuguese professional footballer who plays for Belenenses as a forward.

Football career
On 26 August 2018, Maria made his professional debut with Cova da Piedade in a 2018–19 LigaPro match against Oliveirense.

References

External links

1996 births
Footballers from Lisbon
Living people
Portuguese footballers
Association football defenders
Portugal youth international footballers
AD Oeiras players
Real S.C. players
S.U. 1º Dezembro players
C.D. Cova da Piedade players
GS Loures players
C.F. Estrela da Amadora players
Liga Portugal 2 players
Campeonato de Portugal (league) players